Hefin O'Hare (born 2 June 1979) is a Welsh former professional rugby union and rugby league footballer who played in the 1990s, 2000s and 2010s.

Background
Hefin O'Hare was born in Wrexham, Wales,

As of 2018, he is a Chartered Building Surveyor in Edinburgh, and regularly does charity work.

Rugby league career

Professional career
Switching code from rugby union, O'Hare moved from Leeds Carnegie to Leeds Rhinos. He played for the Leeds rugby league side from 1999 to 2000, he was then transferred to Huddersfield Giants, where he played from 2000 to 2005.

International career

He played for Wales in the 2000 Rugby League World Cup.

Rugby union career

Amateur career

While at the provincial district Glasgow Warriors, he was to play for various Scottish amateur sides.

In the 2008–09 season, O'Hare was at Edinburgh Academicals.

In the 2009-10 and 2010–11 season he played for Dundee HSFP.

After finishing his professional career, he then played for Glasgow Hutchesons Aloysians.

Professional career

O'Hare started playing rugby with Leeds Carnegie. He was with the Yorkshire club from 1997 to 1999. He then switched codes to play rugby league.

O'Hare joined Glasgow Warriors in 2005, switching code back from rugby league, to play rugby union once again.

International career

O'Hare qualified to play rugby union for Scotland after fulfilling his residency period. He stated: "It was a dream of mine to play for Scotland ever since I became eligible."

O'Hare was capped by Scotland 7s.

References

External links
(archived by web.archive.org) Glasgow profile
(archived by web.archive.org) Scotland 7s Profile

1979 births
Living people
Commonwealth Games rugby sevens players of Scotland
Dundee HSFP players
Edinburgh Academicals rugby union players
Footballers who switched code
Glasgow Hutchesons Aloysians RFC players
Glasgow Warriors players
Huddersfield Giants players
Leeds Tykes players
Leeds Rhinos players
Male rugby sevens players
New Brighton F.C. players
Rugby league centres
Rugby league fullbacks
Rugby league hookers
Rugby league locks
Rugby league players from Wrexham
Rugby league wingers
Rugby sevens players at the 2010 Commonwealth Games
Rugby union centres
Rugby union players from Wrexham
Rugby union wings
Scotland international rugby sevens players
Scottish rugby union players
Wales national rugby league team players
Welsh rugby league players